Rolf Maier (born 16 December 1936) is a French weightlifter. He competed at the 1960 Summer Olympics, the 1964 Summer Olympics and the 1968 Summer Olympics.

References

1936 births
Living people
French male weightlifters
Olympic weightlifters of France
Weightlifters at the 1960 Summer Olympics
Weightlifters at the 1964 Summer Olympics
Weightlifters at the 1968 Summer Olympics
Sportspeople from Stuttgart